Rambergssjøen or Rambergsjøen is a lake in the municipality of Røros in Trøndelag county, Norway. The lake is located along the river Håelva, just downstream from the lake Håsjøen.

See also
List of lakes in Norway

References

	

Røros
Lakes of Trøndelag